Shonisauridae is an early group of ichthyosaurs, living in the late Triassic period.

References

Triassic ichthyosaurs
Prehistoric reptile families